Phonek Or.Kwanmuang, is a Thai Muay Thai fighter.

Career
On April 27, 2015 Phonek defeated Sibmuen Sitchefboontham by decision at the Rajadamnern Stadium.

On May 27, 2016 Phonek faced Anthony Defretin for the vacant Rajadamnern Stadium 140 lbs title. He won the fight by decision.

On February 23, 2017 Phonek faced Panpayak Sitchefboontham for the vacant WBC Muay Thai World 135 lbs title. He lost the fight by decision.

Phonek was scheduled to face Pettawee Sor Kittichai at The Champion Muaythai on September 26, 2020. He won the fight by decision.

November 17, 2020 Phonek defeated Julio Lobo by decision at a Sor.Sommai promotion show. Many of the observers disagreed with the decision and a rematch was scheduled.

Titles and accomplishments
Rajadamnern Stadium
 2016 Rajadamnern Stadium 140 lbs Champion

Muay Siam Omnoi Stadium
 2017 Omnoi Stadium 147 lbs Champion

Muay Thai record

|-  style="background:#fbb;"
| 2022-08-24|| Loss ||align=left| Taksila SathianMuaythai|| Muay Thai Palangmai, Rajadamnern Stadium || Bangkok, Thailand ||Decision ||5 ||3:00

|-  style="background:#cfc;"
| 2022-07-30|| Win ||align=left| Petchsaifah SorJor.Vichitpadriew || Jitmuangnon Superfight, Or.Tor.Gor.3 Stadium || Nonthaburi, Thailand || Decision || 5 || 3:00

|-  style="background:#fbb;"
| 2021-04-02|| Loss ||align=left| Saenpon PetchpacharaAcademy || True4U Muaymunwansuk, Rangsit Stadium|| Pathum Thani, Thailand ||Decision ||5 ||3:00

|-  style="background:#cfc;"
| 2020-11-17|| Win ||align=left| Julio Lobo || Sor.Sommai, CentralPlaza Nakhon Ratchasima|| Nakhon Ratchasima, Thailand ||Decision ||5 ||3:00

|-  style="background:#cfc;"
| 2020-09-26|| Win ||align=left| Pettawee Sor Kittichai || The Champion Muaythai, Max Muay Thai Stadium || Pattaya, Thailand || Decision || 3 || 3:00

|-  style="background:#fbb;"
| 2020-08-08 || Loss ||align=left| Chamuaktong Fightermuaythai || SuekJaoMuayThai, Siam Omnoi Stadium || Samut Sakhon, Thailand || Decision  || 5 || 3:00
|-
! style=background:white colspan=9 |

|-  style="background:#fbb;"
| 2020-03-07 || Loss ||align=left| Pongsiri P.K.Saenchaimuaythaigym || SuekJaoMuayThai, Omnoi Stadium || Samut Sakhon, Thailand || Decision  || 5 || 3:00 
|-
! style=background:white colspan=9 |

|-  style="background:#fbb;"
| 2020-01-16 || Loss ||align=left| Pongsiri P.K.Saenchaimuaythaigym || Omnoi Stadium || Samut Sakhon, Thailand || Decision  || 5 || 3:00 

|-  style="background:#cfc;"
| 2019-11-07 || Win ||align=left| Pongsiri P.K.Saenchaimuaythaigym || Ruamponkon Prachin || Prachinburi Province, Thailand || Decision  || 5 || 3:00

|-  style="background:#cfc;"
| 2019-06-04 || Win ||align=left| Rungnapa Pinsinchai || Lumpinee Stadium || Bangkok, Thailand || Decision|| 5 || 3:00

|- style="background:#fbb;"
| 2019-04-20 || Loss||align=left| Singsuriya Mor.Rattanabandit  || Omnoi Stadium || Bangkok, Thailand ||  Decision|| 5 || 3:00 

|-  style="background:#cfc;"
| 2019-02-07 || Win ||align=left| Panpayak Sitchefboontham || Rajadamnern Stadium || Bangkok, Thailand || Decision|| 5 || 3:00

|- style="background:#cfc;"
| 2019-01-05 || Win ||align=left| Singsuriya Mor.Rattanabandit  || Omnoi Stadium || Bangkok, Thailand || KO || 3 || 

|- style="background:#fbb;"
| 2018-12-12 || Loss ||align=left| Singsuriya Mor.Rattanabandit  || Petchaopraya, Rajadamnern Stadium || Bangkok, Thailand || Decision || 5 || 3:00

|-  style="background:#fbb;"
| 2018-11-15 || Loss ||align=left| Yodpanomrung Jitmuangnon || Rajadamnern Stadium || Bangkok, Thailand || Decision  || 5 || 3:00

|-  bgcolor="#cfc"
| 2018-09-27 || Win || align=left| Chadd Collins || Sor.Sommai, Rajadamnern Stadium || Bangkok, Thailand || Decision || 5 || 3:00

|- style="background:#fbb;"
| 2018-08-25 || Loss||align=left| Thananchai Rachanon || Omnoi Stadium || Samut Sakhon, Thailand || Decision || 5 || 3:00
|-
! style=background:white colspan=9 |

|-  bgcolor="#cfc"
| 2018-07-25 || Win || align=left| Chadd Collins || Sor.Sommai, Rajadamnern Stadium || Bangkok, Thailand || Decision || 5 || 3:00

|- style="background:#cfc;"
| 2018-07-07|| Win || align="left" | Manuele Perra || THAI FIGHT Hat Yai || Hat Yai, Thailand || TKO (Doctor stoppage) || 2 ||

|- style="background:#cfc;"
| 2018-06-04 || Win ||align=left| Singsuriya Mor.Rattanabandit  || Petchaopraya, Rajadamnern Stadium || Bangkok, Thailand || Decision || 5 || 3:00

|- style="background:#cfc;"
| 2018-04-14 || Win ||align=left| Aroondej M16 || Omnoi Stadium || Samut Sakhon, Thailand || Decision || 5 || 3:00
|-
! style=background:white colspan=9 |

|-  style="background:#cfc;"
| 2018-03-17 || Win ||align=left| Faipa Sor.Narongrit || Omnoi Stadium || Samut Sakhon, Thailand || KO (Knees)|| 4 || 

|- style="background:#fbb;"
| 2018-01-13 || Loss ||align=left| Chalamphet Tor.Laksong || Omnoi Stadium - Isuzu Cup, Semi Final || Samut Sakhon, Thailand || Decision || 5 || 3:00 

|-  style="background:#cfc;"
| 2017-11-25 || Win ||align=left| Jojo 13CoinsResort ||Omnoi Stadium - Isuzu Cup ||  Samut Sakhon, Thailand || KO || 5 || 

|-  style="background:#cfc;"
| 2017-09-23 || Win ||align=left| Satanfah Rachanon ||Omnoi Stadium - Isuzu Cup ||  Samut Sakhon, Thailand || Decision || 5 || 3:00

|- style="background:#cfc;"
| 2017-09-02 || Win ||align=left| Chaidet M16 || Omnoi Stadium - Isuzu Cup || Samut Sakhon, Thailand || Decision || 5 || 3:00 

|- style="background:#fbb;"
| 2017-07-02 || Loss ||align=left| Wanchalerm Sitsornong || Rangsit Stadium || Pathum Thani, Thailand || Decision || 5 || 3:00

|-  style="background:#fbb;"
| 2017-05-31|| Loss ||align=left| Kongsak Sitboonmee|| Sor.SommaiRajadamnern Stadium || Bangkok, Thailand || Decision || 5 || 3:00

|- style="background:#cfc;"
| 2017-04-09 || Win ||align=left| Wanchalerm Sitsornong || Rangsit Stadium || Pathum Thani,  Thailand || Decision || 5 || 3:00

|-  style="background:#fbb;"
| 2017-02-23 || Loss ||align=left| Panpayak Sitjatik || Rajadamnern Stadium || Bangkok, Thailand || Decision|| 5 || 3:00 
|-
! style=background:white colspan=9 |

|-  style="background:#cfc;"
| 2017-01-25 || Win ||align=left| Kongburi Wor.Sangprapai || Wanmeechai, Rajadamnern Stadium || Bangkok, Thailand || KO (Left lbow)|| 3 || 

|-  style="background:#fbb;"
| 2017-01-01 || Loss ||align=left| Panpayak Sitjatik || Rajadamnern Stadium || Bangkok, Thailand || Decision|| 5 || 3:00

|- style="background:#fbb;"
| 2016-09-24 || Loss ||align=left| Wanchalerm Sitsornong || Omnoi Stadium || Samut Sakhon, Thailand || Decision || 5 || 3:00 

|-  style="background:#fbb;"
| 2016-08-22 || Loss ||align=left| Panpayak Sitjatik || Rajadamnern Stadium || Bangkok, Thailand || Decision|| 5 || 3:00

|- style="background:#cfc;"
| 2016-07-17 || Win ||align=left| Inseetong Por.Phinabhat || Omnoi Stadium || Samut Sakhon, Thailand || Decision || 5 || 3:00 

|- style="text-align:center; background:#cfc;"
| 2016-06-18
| Win
| align="left" | Manachai Kiatmuu9
| Omnoi Stadium
| Samut Sakhon, Thailand 
| Decision
| 5
| 3:00

|- style="background:#cfc;"
| 2016-05-27 || Win ||align=left| Anthony Defretin || Best of Siam 8, Rajadamnern Stadium || Bangkok, Thailand || Decision || 5 || 3:00
|-
! style=background:white colspan=9 |

|-  style="background:#fbb;"
| 2016-03-13 || Loss ||align=left| Petchmorakot  RungrienkilaKorat || Rajadamnern Stadium || Bangkok, Thailand || Decision || 5 || 3:00

|-  style="background:#cfc;"
| 2016-02-07 || Win ||align=left| Sibmuen Sitchefboontham || Rajadamnern Stadium || Bangkok, Thailand || KO || 3 ||

|-  style="background:#fbb;"
| 2015-12-27 || Loss ||align=left| Songkom Nayoksanya || Rajadamnern Stadium || Bangkok, Thailand || Decision || 5 || 3:00

|-  style="background:#cfc;"
| 2015-10-22 || Win ||align=left| Samingdet Dekfaifa || Chujaroen, Rajadamnern Stadium || Bangkok, Thailand || Decision || 5 || 3:00

|-  style="background:#cfc;"
| 2015-09-10 || Win ||align=left| Yodlekpet Or. Pitisak ||  Rajadamnern Stadium || Bangkok, Thailand || Decision || 5 || 3:00

|-  style="background:#fbb;"
| 2015-07-15|| Loss ||align=left| Panpayak Sitjatik || Rajadamnern Stadium || Bangkok, Thailand || Decision || 5 || 3:00

|-  style="background:#cfc;"
| 2015-06-10|| Win ||align=left| Panpayak Sitjatik || Rajadamnern Stadium || Bangkok, Thailand || Decision || 5 || 3:00

|-  style="background:#cfc;"
| 2015-04-27 || Win ||align=left| Sibmuen Sitchefboontham || Rajadamnern Stadium || Bangkok, Thailand || Decision || 5 || 3:00

|- style="background:#fbb;"
| 2015-03-15 || Loss ||align=left| Orono Yor.Yong101|| Rajadamnern Stadium || Bangkok, Thailand || Decision || 5|| 3:00

|- style="background:#fbb;"
| 2015-02-15 || Loss ||align=left| Pethchbunchu RungrienkilaKorat || Rajadamnern Stadium || Bangkok, Thailand || Decision || 5|| 3:00

|- style="background:#cfc;"
| 2015-01-24 || Win ||align=left| Saphanphet Sititsukto || Omnoi Stadium || Samut Sakhon, Thailand || Decision || 5 || 3:00 

|- style="background:#fbb;"
| 2014-11-16 || Loss ||align=left| Sangthongnoi Thanasuranakorn|| Rajadamnern Stadium || Bangkok, Thailand || Decision || 5|| 3:00

|- style="background:#fbb;"
| 2014-10-16 || Loss ||align=left| Jompichit Chuwattana|| Chujaroen, Rajadamnern Stadium]] || Bangkok, Thailand || Decision || 5|| 3:00

|- style="background:#fbb;"
| 2014-09-06 || Loss ||align=left| Petchmai Lukbunmee || Omnoi Stadium || Samut Sakhon, Thailand || Decision || 5 || 3:00 

|- style="background:#fbb;"
| 2014-08-14 || Loss ||align=left| Kaimukkao Por.Thairongruangkamai|| Chujaroen, Rajadamnern Stadium || Bangkok, Thailand || Decision || 5|| 3:00

|- style="background:#cfc;"
| 2014-07-21 || Win ||align=left| Khumsap Suwit Gym || Sor.Sommai, Rajadamnern Stadium || Bangkok, Thailand || Decision || 5|| 3:00

|- style="background:#cfc;"
| 2014-06-19 || Win ||align=left| Daotrang Chor Na Phatthalung || Tor.Chaiwat, Rajadamnern Stadium || Bangkok, Thailand || Decision || 5|| 3:00

|- style="background:#cfc;"
| 2014-05-29 || Win ||align=left| Chok Sor.Jor.WichitPaedRiew || Omnoi Stadium || Samut Sakhon, Thailand || KO || 4 || 

|- style="background:#c5d2ea;"
| 2014-04-30 || Draw ||align=left| Khunsueklek Aor Kwanmuang || Rajadamnern Stadium || Bangkok, Thailand || Decision || 5|| 3:00

|- style="background:#cfc;"
| 2014-02-22 || Win ||align=left| Hannatee Kiatjaroenchai || Omnoi Stadium || Samut Sakhon, Thailand || KO (Elbow)|| 2 || 

|- style="background:#fbb;"
| 2014-01-11 || Loss ||align=left| Hannatee Kiatjaroenchai || Omnoi Stadium || Samut Sakhon, Thailand || Decision || 5 || 3:00 

|- style="background:#cfc;"
| 2013-09-28 || Win ||align=left| Rungsangtawan Sit Or Boonchuay || Omnoi Stadium || Samut Sakhon, Thailand || KO (Knees)|| 4 || 

|-
| colspan=9 | Legend:

References

Phonek Or.Kwanmuang
Living people
1992 births